Tennessee's 7th Senate district is one of 33 districts in the Tennessee Senate. It has been represented by Republican Richard Briggs since his 2014 primary defeat of fellow Republican Stacey Campfield.

Geography
District 7 covers a gerrymandered swath of Knox County, including parts of downtown Knoxville as well as nearby suburbs such as Farragut.

The district is located entirely within Tennessee's 2nd congressional district, and overlaps with the 13th, 14th, 15th, 16th, 18th, 19th, and 89th districts of the Tennessee House of Representatives.

Recent election results
Tennessee Senators are elected to staggered four-year terms, with odd-numbered districts holding elections in midterm years and even-numbered districts holding elections in presidential years.

2018

2014

Federal and statewide results in District 7

References 

7
Knox County, Tennessee